"Eye of the Needle" is a song recorded by Australian recording artist Sia for her sixth studio album, 1000 Forms of Fear (2014). The song was released on 3 June 2014 as a promotional single by Inertia in Australia and Monkey Puzzle and RCA Records globally. It appeared on record charts of Australia, France and the United Kingdom.

Background and composition
"Eye of the Needle" was released as streamed audio as a promotional tool for Sia's album 1000 Forms of Fear on 2 June 2014. The song was written by Chris Braide and Sia, while production was handled by Greg Kurstin.

Collaboration
In 2015, Adult Swim released a remix of the song featuring Big Freedia as part of the Adult Swim Singles Program.

Track listing
Digital download
"Eye of the Needle" – 4:09

Credits and personnel 
Credits adapted from liner notes of 1000 Forms of Fear and Tidal.

 Sia Furler – composer, lyricist
 Christopher Braide – composer, lyricist
 Greg Kurstin – producer, bass, drums, guitar, mellotron, piano, engineer
 Jesse Shatkin – engineer
 Alex Pasco – additional engineering
 Julian Burg – additional engineering
 Manny Marroquin – mixer
 Emily Lazar – masterer

Charts

Release history

References

External links

2014 singles
Sia (musician) songs
Songs written by Chris Braide
Song recordings produced by Greg Kurstin
RCA Records singles
Songs written by Sia (musician)
2014 songs